The Church of St Nicholas and St Faith  is a Church of England parish church in Saltash, Cornwall. The church is a grade I listed building.

History
The earliest parts of the church date to the Norman period. The church was remodelled in 14th and 15th centuries. It is built of rubble and has a slate roof. The church consists of a nave, a north aisle with five bays, a south porch, and a tower to the north.

For 700 years of its existence, this church was a chapel-of-ease of the Church of St Stephen, Saltash. In 1881, by order of the Privy Council, the chapel became a Parish Church in its own right. Therefore, what had once been known as St Nicholas' Chapel, became the Parish Church of St Nicholas and St Faith.

On 17 January 1952, the church was designated a grade I listed building.

Present day
The Church of St Nicholas and St Faith is part of the Benefice of Saltash alongside the Church of St Stephen, Saltash. The parish of St. Nicholas and St. Faith Saltash is part of the Saltash Team Ministry in the Archdeaconry of Bodmin of the Diocese of Truro.

References

External links

 Parish website 
 A Church Near You entry

Saltash
Saltash
Diocese of Truro